Rhoose is the name of an electoral ward in the Vale of Glamorgan, Wales, which covers its namesake village, Rhoose, as well as Penmark and the neighbouring community of Llancarfan. The ward elects three county councillors to the Vale of Glamorgan Council.

According to the 2011 census the population of the ward was 6,907.

2022 ward changes
In 2022 the community of Llancarfan was transferred to a new ward as a result of recommendations from the Local Democracy and Boundary Commission for Wales. Despite the area of the Rhoose ward halving, it gained an additional county councillor.

County council elections

2019 by-election
A by-election was due to take place on 14 February 2019 following the resignation of Councillor Matthew Lloyd over the council's plans to move Llancarfan Primary School to a new building in Rhoose. Candidates included the sitting Conservative Wales Assembly Member, Andrew RT Davies. Davies won the election and pledged to oppose the plans of his fellow Conservative councillors to close the local Llancarfan Primary School. He had no plans to stand down from his Assembly seat.

2017 Vale of Glamorgan Council Election
Longstanding Conservative councillor Jeff James, who had first been elected as a councillor in 1979 to the Vale of Glamorgan Borough Council, decided to retire before the May 2017 election. He had also been leader of the Vale of Glamorgan Council fopr seven years from 1999. Both seats were taken by the Conservatives, beating the recently elected Independent councillor into third place.

2016 By-election
Following the death of Cllr Philip Clarke on 31 March 2016 after a motor cycle accident, a by-election took place on 30 June 2016. It was won by Independent candidate Adam Riley.

2012 Vale of Glamorgan Council Election

2008 Vale of Glamorgan Council Election

2004 Vale of Glamorgan Council Election

References

Vale of Glamorgan electoral wards
Rhoose